Yun Ji-hye (born 5 October 1997) is a South Korean female taekwondo practitioner. She represented South Korea at the 2018 Asian Games and claimed a bronze medal jointly with Malaysian Yap Khim Wen in the women's individual poomsae event. This also significantly marked the first medal to be received by South Korea during the 2018 Asian Games.

References 

1997 births
Living people
South Korean female taekwondo practitioners
Taekwondo practitioners at the 2018 Asian Games
Medalists at the 2018 Asian Games
Asian Games bronze medalists for South Korea
Asian Games medalists in taekwondo
Universiade gold medalists for South Korea
Universiade medalists in taekwondo
Medalists at the 2019 Summer Universiade
Medalists at the 2017 Summer Universiade
21st-century South Korean women